Pilodeudorix catori, the Cator's fairy playboy, is a butterfly in the family Lycaenidae. It is found in Senegal (Basse Casamance), Guinea, Sierra Leone, Ivory Coast, Ghana, Nigeria (south and the Cross River loop) and possibly western Cameroon. The habitat consists of dry forests and forest mosaics.

References

Butterflies described in 1903
Deudorigini
Butterflies of Africa
Taxa named by George Thomas Bethune-Baker